Anne Schaefer is a neuroscientist, professor of Neuroscience, vice-chair of Neuroscience, and director of the Center for Glial Biology at the Icahn School of Medicine at Mount Sinai in New York City. Schaefer investigates the epigenetic mechanisms of cellular plasticity and their role in the regulation of microglia-neuron interactions. Her research is aimed at understanding the mechanisms underlying various neuropsychiatric disorders and finding novel ways to target the epigenome therapeutically.

Early life and education 
Schaefer started her medical training at Johannes Gutenberg University Mainz in Germany from 1996 until 1999. Schaefer continued her education by pursuing her MD at the Charite University Berlin, in Germany. She worked under the mentorship of Dr. Ralf Ignatius and then in 2001, Schaefer won the USA-Scholarship of the German National Merit Foundation and to pursue a research internship at The Rockefeller University. As a Visiting Student, Schaefer worked under the mentorship of Dr. Michel Nussenzweig at Rockefeller studying immunology, specifically the adaptive immune lymphocytes called B cells. In her research, she helped discover that 55-75% of the antibodies produced by immature B cells are actually auto-reactive and these B cells are removed from the population during two discrete check points in B cells development.

After her research internship, Schaefer stayed in New York City to complete a Medical Internship at Weill Cornell Medical College within the Sloan Kettering Cancer Center in 2003. Schaefer graduated from Charite University in 2004.

Schaefer came back to Rockefeller in 2004 to pursue postdoctoral training under the mentorship of Dr. Paul Greengard. In the Greengard Lab, Schaefer switched her research focus in the direction of neuroscience and explored epigenetic regulation of neural physiology.

Career and research 
Schaefer remained in Greengard’s lab as a research associate from 2007 to 2009 and was promoted to Senior Research Associate in 2009. She held this title until she started her own lab at Mount Sinai School of Medicine in 2011. Schaefer is currently a tenured professor in the Department of Neuroscience and Psychiatry at the Friedman Brain Institute at Mount Sinai School and remains an adjunct faculty member at Rockefeller University. In 2012 named the Chrissy Rossi Investigator at Mount Sinai. In 2017, Schaefer co-founded the Center for Glial Biology at Mount Sinai and is now the co-director of the center alongside Dr. Patrizia Casaccia. As of 2018, Schaefer was promoted to vice-chair of Neuroscience at Sinai. The Schaefer Lab studies the epigenetic mechanisms of cellular plasticity, maintenance of neuronal identity, as well as the role of epigenetics in regulating neuron-microglia interactions. One of the goals of her lab is to develop tools and therapies with which to target the epigenome to treat neurological disorders.

The neuronal epigenome 
In 2007, Schaefer published a first author paper discussing the importance of microRNAs (miRNAs) in the regulation of neuronal gene expression. She showed that a conditional knockout of the miRNA generating enzyme, Dicer, lead to death of neurons in the cerebellum. Since loss of miRNA led to cerebellar degeneration, her findings highlight the potential role for dysregulation of miRNAs in neurodegenerative diseases. Further highlighting the role of genetic regulation in brain homeostasis, Schaefer showed in 2009 that a deficiency in the histone methyltransferase complex GLP/G9a leads to defects in learning, motivation, and environmental adaptation in rodents. Histone methyltransferases are a key regulator in gene expression. They manipulate the state of DNA, which can be either open, referred to as euchromatin or closed, referred to as heterochromatin. Later in her postdoc, Schafer helped elucidate the role of transcriptional regulation in the context of drug addiction in mice. She found that a deficiency in argonaute 2 (a gene known to regulate the generation of miRNA) in the dopamine receptor 2 (Drd2) positive cells in the striatum caused a decrease in the motivation to seek cocaine. Schaefer further explored which miRNAs are modulated by argonaute 2 to elucidate specifically which miRNAs might be important in mediating addition to cocaine.

Once Schaefer started her lab at Mount Sinai, she continued to probe the role of transcriptional regulation on neuronal function and driving behavior. In 2013, she published a paper in Science showing that a specific miRNA, miRNA-128, governs neuronal excitability and motor behavior in mice. When they suppressed this miRNA, aberrant motor patterns and fatal epilepsy resulted. Seeing how critical the presence of this one miRNA seemed to be in regulating neuronal excitability, Schaefer and Greengard filed a patent for using miRNA manipulation as a treatment for motor diseases and seizures. Overall, Schaefer's work has highlighted the importance of understanding epigenetics and transcriptional regulation in the context of brain related diseases.

Epigenetics and autism spectrum disorders 
Schaefer's work has also increased our understanding of the epigenetic mechanisms contributing to Autism Spectrum Disorders. Her lab identified the bromodomain and extraterminal domain-containing proteins (BETs) as potent regulators of genes involved in generating ASD-type behaviors in mouse models. When they suppressed BET proteins they found decreased neuronal gene expression and neuronal dysfunction which suggested a role for the BET-controlled gene network in ASD. Following up on this work, Schaefer and her colleagues hypothesized that ASDs are disorders of gene regulatory networks which are inevitably influenced by both genetic and environmental factors, consistent with broad array of factors that we find linked to ASD development in humans.

Epigenetics and microglia 
Another facet of Schaefer's work is understanding the impact of epigenetic regulation on neuroimmunity, with a particular focus on the innate immune cells of the brain, microglia. In a paper published in Nature Neuroscience in 2018, Schaefer and her colleagues showed that epigenetic regulation underlies differences in microglial behavior across different brain regions. They found that baseline phagocytic activity of microglia was high in the cerebellum but low in the striatum. Using the TRAP technique developed by Schaefer in 2011, they discovered that the polycomb repressive complex 2 (PRC2), which mediates repressive chromatin modifications, is actively repressing phagocytic phenotypes and morphological changes in striatal microglia. When they inhibited PRC2, microglia exhibited robust phagocytic activity even in the absence of dying neurons. These findings highlighted a critical role for epigenetic regulation of microglia in diseases where aberrantly activated microglia lead to over-pruning and neurodegeneration. To understand more deeply what drives the unique epigenetic programming of cerebellar versus striatal microglia, Schaefer collaborated with Dr. Miriam Merad’s group at Sinai to look at ontology of cerebellar versus striatal microglia. They found that cerebellar microglial identity was driven by interactions between CSF-1 and the CSF-1 receptor, and was not reliant on the alternate CSF-1R ligand, IL-34. When they depleted CSF-1, it led to disruptions in cerebellar microglia development as well as cerebellar neuron function but had no effect on the development of forebrain microglia.

Pharmaceutical industry involvement 
In addition to her academic involvements, Schaefer is also a consultant for the pharmaceutical company Neuroinflammation NewCo and is involved in the committees and data safety monitoring of Eli Lilly, Genentech Inc, GlaxoSmithKline, and Regenxbio.

In 2011, Schaefer was part of a team that filed a patent for a method of translational profiling and molecular phenotyping of mRNAs from specific cell types. The TRAP (Translating Ribosome Affinity Purification) methodology that is described in this patent provides a way to detect genes that are co-regulated within or across cell types, as well as discover candidate gene targets for treating specific neurological disorders and screen for modulators of those candidate genes. The method involves isolating mRNAs that are in complex with a ribosome that is presumably in the process of translating the mRNA. The TRAP technique is now widely used by scientists to find vulnerable cell types or modulators associated with particular diseases.

In 2013, Schaefer and her postdoctoral advisor, Dr. Paul Greengard, filed a patent for a therapeutic strategy to treat or reduce the likelihood of seizures. Schaefer and Greengard found that the microRNA miR-128 is involved in modulating neuronal excitability and motor activity. Their therapeutic strategy involves administering miR-128, an agent with 90% sequence homology, or an agent capable of increasing the expression or activity of miR-128 as a means to control dopamine receptor 1 (Drdr1) neuron excitability. The agent would be administered intrathecally, intranasally, or directly to the hippocampus or cortex via an injection.

Awards and honors 
1999-2003 Scholarship of the German National Merit Foundation

2001-2003 USA-Scholarship of the German National Merit Foundation

2003 Keystone Scholar Travel Award

2004 Summa cum laude, Charité University Berlin

2005 Hans-Hench Award 2005, German Society for Immunology, Germany

2006-2008 German Research Foundation DFG, Research Fellowship, Germany

2011 2010 NARSAD Young Investigator Award, USA

2012 named “Chrissy Rossi Investigator”

2012 Seaver Autism Center Research Award, USA

2012 NIH Director's New Innovator Award, USA

2014 Technology Development Fund Award, Mount Sinai Innovation, USA

2014 Cure Challenge Award, USA

2014 Kavli Frontiers in Science Fellow, The National Academy of Science, USA

2015 Harold and Golden Lamport Research Award, Mount Sinai, USA

2017 co-director, Center for Glial Biology, Mount Sinai School of Medicine, USA

2018 Inaugural NINDS Landis Award for Outstanding Mentorship, NIH, USA

2018 Inventor of the Year 2018 Award, Mount Sinai, USA

2019 Vice Chair of Neuroscience, Mount Sinai, USA

2019 Max Planck Sabbatical Award

Selected publications 

 Ayata P, Schaefer A. Innate sensing of mechanical properties of brain tissue by microglia. Curr Opin Immunol. 2020 Feb;62:123-130. doi: 10.1016/j.coi.2020.01.003. Epub 2020 Feb 10. Review. PubMed ; PubMed Central PMCID: PMC7067639.
 Sullivan JM, De Rubeis S, Schaefer A. Convergence of spectrums: neuronal gene network states in autism spectrum disorder. Curr Opin Neurobiol. 2019 Dec;59:102-111. doi: 10.1016/j.conb.2019.04.011. Epub 2019 Jun 18. Review. PubMed ; PubMed Central PMCID: PMC6888864.
 Kana V, Desland FA, Casanova-Acebes M, Ayata P, Badimon A, Nabel E, Yamamuro K, Sneeboer M, Tan IL, Flanigan ME, Rose SA, Chang C, Leader A, Le Bourhis H, Sweet ES, Tung N, Wroblewska A, Lavin Y, See P, Baccarini A, Ginhoux F, Chitu V, Stanley ER, Russo SJ, Yue Z, Brown BD, Joyner AL, De Witte LD, Morishita H, Schaefer A, Merad M. CSF-1 controls cerebellar microglia and is required for motor function and social interaction. J Exp Med. 2019 Oct 7;216(10):2265-2281. doi: 10.1084/jem.20182037. Epub 2019 Jul 26. PubMed ; PubMed Central PMCID: PMC6781012.
 Ayata P, Badimon A, Strasburger HJ, Duff MK, Montgomery SE, Loh YE, Ebert A, Pimenova AA, Ramirez BR, Chan AT, Sullivan JM, Purushothaman I, Scarpa JR, Goate AM, Busslinger M, Shen L, Losic B, Schaefer A. Epigenetic regulation of brain region-specific microglia clearance activity. Nat Neurosci. 2018 Aug;21(8):1049-1060. doi: 10.1038/s41593-018-0192-3. Epub 2018 Jul 23. PubMed ; PubMed Central PMCID: PMC6090564.
 von Schimmelmann M, Feinberg PA, Sullivan JM, Ku SM, Badimon A, Duff MK, Wang Z, Lachmann A, Dewell S, Ma'ayan A, Han MH, Tarakhovsky A, Schaefer A. Polycomb repressive complex 2 (PRC2) silences genes responsible for neurodegeneration. Nat Neurosci. 2016 Oct;19(10):1321-30. doi: 10.1038/nn.4360. Epub 2016 Aug 15. PubMed ; PubMed Central PMCID: PMC5088783.
 Sullivan JM, Badimon A, Schaefer U, Ayata P, Gray J, Chung CW, von Schimmelmann M, Zhang F, Garton N, Smithers N, Lewis H, Tarakhovsky A, Prinjha RK, Schaefer A. Autism-like syndrome is induced by pharmacological suppression of BET proteins in young mice. J Exp Med. 2015 Oct 19;212(11):1771-81. doi: 10.1084/jem.20151271. Epub 2015 Sep 21. PubMed ; PubMed Central PMCID: PMC4612093.
 Tan CL, Plotkin JL, Venø MT, von Schimmelmann M, Feinberg P, Mann S, Handler A, Kjems J, Surmeier DJ, O'Carroll D, Greengard P, Schaefer A. MicroRNA-128 governs neuronal excitability and motor behavior in mice. Science. 2013 Dec 6;342(6163):1254-8. doi: 10.1126/science.1244193. PubMed ; PubMed Central PMCID: PMC3932786.
 Schaefer A, Im HI, Venø MT, Fowler CD, Min A, Intrator A, Kjems J, Kenny PJ, O'Carroll D, Greengard P. Argonaute 2 in dopamine 2 receptor-expressing neurons regulates cocaine addiction. J Exp Med. 2010 Aug 30;207(9):1843-51. doi: 10.1084/jem.20100451. Epub 2010 Jul 19. PubMed ; PubMed Central PMCID: PMC2931161.
 Schaefer A, Sampath SC, Intrator A, Min A, Gertler TS, Surmeier DJ, Tarakhovsky A, Greengard P. Control of cognition and adaptive behavior by the GLP/G9a epigenetic suppressor complex. Neuron. 2009 Dec 10;64(5):678-91. doi: 10.1016/j.neuron.2009.11.019. PubMed ; PubMed Central PMCID: PMC2814156.
 Schaefer A, O'Carroll D, Tan CL, Hillman D, Sugimori M, Llinas R, Greengard P. Cerebellar neurodegeneration in the absence of microRNAs. J Exp Med. 2007 Jul 9;204(7):1553-8. doi: 10.1084/jem.20070823. Epub 2007 Jul 2. PubMed ; PubMed Central PMCID: PMC2118654.
 Wardemann H, Yurasov S, Schaefer A, Young JW, Meffre E, Nussenzweig MC. Predominant autoantibody production by early human B cell precursors. Science. 2003 Sep 5;301(5638):1374-7. doi: 10.1126/science.1086907. Epub 2003 Aug 14. PubMed .

References 

Women cognitive scientists
German women neuroscientists
German women scientists
Living people
Johannes Gutenberg University Mainz alumni
Icahn School of Medicine at Mount Sinai faculty
Year of birth missing (living people)
Max Planck Institute directors